Achinoam Nini (born ), also known professionally as Noa, is an Israeli singer-songwriter, percussionist, poet, composer, and human rights activist working internationally. She is accompanied by guitarist Gil Dor and often plays the conga drums and percussions as she sings. Noa represented Israel at the Eurovision Song Contest in 2009 together with singer Mira Awad, with the song "There Must Be Another Way". Her music is known to fuse languages and styles. She has performed in 52 countries and was the first Israeli artist to perform in the Vatican.

Early and personal life
Noa was born in Tel Aviv, Israel, to a family of Yemenite-Jewish origin. She moved to New York City at the age of two. She attended SAR Academy and Rabbi Joseph H. Lookstein Upper School of Ramaz High School, remaining in New York until her return to Israel alone at the age of 16.

She completed her mandatory service in the Israel Defense Forces, serving as a singer in the military band of the Northern Command. After her release she studied music at the Rimon School of Jazz and Contemporary Music in Ramat Hasharon, Israel, where she met her long-time partner and collaborator Gil Dor, then a faculty member of the school.

Noa is married to Asher Barak, an Israeli pediatrician. They have three children.

Music career

Noa has performed in a variety of locations around the world, including Carnegie Hall and Avery Fisher Hall in New York City, Olympia in Paris, Rome's Colosseum, The Barbican in London, Zellerbach Auditorium in Berkeley, California, the Ravinia Festival in Chicago, the Montreux Jazz Festival in Switzerland, the North Sea Jazz Festival in the Netherlands, the Stockholm Water Festival in Sweden, Palau de la Música Catalana in Barcelona and Teatro Real in Madrid.

Noa has recorded songs in English, Hebrew, Yemenite Hebrew, Spanish, Neapolitan, French, Italian, Sardinian, Galician, and Arabic. Noa and Gil Dor have had various ensembles since their early days as an acoustic duet. Noa and Dor's ensembles vary from album to album, ranging from collaborations with musicians such as: Zohar Fresco, Steve Rodby, Solis String Quartet, Hila Carni and symphonic orchestras around the world. Noa's music is influenced by the singer-songwriters of the 60s such as Paul Simon, Joni Mitchell, Leonard Cohen, and James Taylor. These musical and lyrical sensibilities, combined with Noa's Yemenite roots and Dor's background in jazz, classical rock, have created Noa and Dor's unique sound audible through hundreds of songs written and performed by the duo. Noa plays percussion, guitar and piano. 

In 1994, Noa performed Ave Maria with English lyrics she wrote for a live audience of 100,000 and a TV audience of millions at the closing event of the International Year of the Family at the Vatican, Rome, Italy, witnessed by Pope John Paul II.

Noa and Dor have performed on numerous occasions with the Israel Philharmonic Orchestra. They recorded an album during a live performance at Tel Aviv's Mann Auditorium in 1997. Over the years they have collaborated with symphonic orchestras from Lille, Messina, Parma, Murcia, and Florence. In September 2003, Noa performed an orchestral piece entitled L'isola della Luce (after the Greek island on which it was performed) which was written by Nicola Piovani especially for her. The work was commissioned by the Cultural Olympics Committee in Athens. In May 2004, the duo performed with the Israeli rhythm and dance troupe Mayumana between the two final games of the Euroleague basketball championship.

Eurovision Song Contest

Together with Arab-Israeli singer Mira Awad, Noa represented Israel at the Eurovision Song Contest 2009. Their song "There Must Be Another Way" qualified for the first semi-final but eventually finished in 16th place.  About the song, Noa sais If we can truly empathize with each other's sorrow, if we can cry together, then we can also reach the next level of building and overcoming all our other differences.

Soundtracks
In 1998, Noa recorded the part of Esmeralda in French for the original soundtrack of the multi-Platinum selling "Notre Dame de Paris", but did not play the role in the musical. Her song "Babel", written in English, French and Hebrew as theme song for the Gerard Pullicino movie of the same name, topped the charts in France the following year.

Noa collaborated with French composer Éric Serra on two songs: one for the film The Experience of Love from the James Bond film GoldenEye, and the song "My Heart Is Calling" from the Luc Besson film The Messenger.

In 2000, Noa recorded the theme song "La vita è bella" of the film "Life Is Beautiful", Roberto Benigni's Oscar award-winning film. Noa also wrote the lyrics to the song now titled "Beautiful That Way", together with Dor. The song was recorded and released with the album Blue Touches Blue, and also appears on the soundtrack to the film as well as on her album Noa Gold in two versions.

Duets and collaborations
Noa and Dor have collaborated with Khaled from Algeria, Nabil Salameh, of Palestinian origin, born in Lebanon, Handallah from Nablus, Rim Banna from Nazareth, Amal Murkus from Kfar Yasif, and Mira Awad from Kfar Raameh.

Due to her success in Spain, Noa has also developed several duets with Spanish artists, singing Spanish songs in Spanish. Starting La vida es bella with singer Miguel Bosé, she also recorded Es caprichoso el azar along with Joan Manuel Serrat or Tú y yo along with Joaquín Sabina. 

In May 2002, she took part in a concert at the Rome Colosseum, under the banner of "Time for Life – A Tribute for Peace", featuring Ray Charles, Mercedes Sosa, Khaled, Nicola Piovani, and artists from Afghanistan, Sarajevo, Belgrade, Africa and Ireland. In May 2004, she performed in We Are the Future, a globally telecast fund raising concert for children in conflict areas. On 2 July 2005, she performed in Bono and Bob Geldof's Live 8 concert in Rome's Circo Massimo.
In September 2005, she performed at the Ambrosetti Forum which took place in Villa d'Este, Como, Italy, in the presence of Shimon Peres, Saeb Erekat and Amr Moussa.

In November 2010, Noa and Mira Awad performed at the closing concert of the Science for Peace event hosted by the Fondazione Umberto Veronesi at the Bocconi University of Milan, Italy.

Awards and recognition

In 1998 Noa won the "Crystal Award" by the "World Economic Forum" in Davos, Switzerland, where she performed together with Palestinian artists and participated in numerous panels dealing with peace in the Middle East and the role of art and artists towards bringing it about.
In 2000, the mayor of Melpignano, Italy, awarded honorary citizenship to Noa and Nabil Salameh (a Palestinian singer songwriter) for their activity for peace.
In 2003 Noa was nominated Israel's first "Goodwill Ambassador" for FAO, the United Nation's Food and Agriculture Organization.
On 3 April 2005, Noa became the first woman to receive the medal of the "Galileo Galilei" order from the "Grand Orient", the Italian arm of the Freemasons. 
On 7 August 2005, Noa received the "Gemona Seminar" prize for artistic excellence and her contribution to peace and understanding.
In 2006, Noa won the "Mia Martini Critics' Award" at the 56th Sanremo Music Festival in Italy, appearing with the Solis String Quartet and Carlo Fava.
In 2008, Noa became a "Cavaliere della Republica" – Knight of the Italian Republic.
In 2018, she was honored with the title "Commendatore Ordine al Merito della Repubblica Italiana" – Commander of the order of merit of the Italian republic. 
In 2018, Noa was also named "Pellegrino de Pace", Pilgrim of Peace, Assisi.
In 2019, Noa was awarded the Shulamit Aloni Lifetime Achievement Award.

Discography
Noa and Gil have written and produced three albums: Achinoam Nini and Gil Dor Live, Achinoam Nini and Gil Dor (also known as Rachel and Leah), and Achinoam Nini. Their five international albums are Noa (produced by Pat Metheny) and Calling (produced by Rupert Hine) for Geffen Records, Blue Touches Blue (produced by Mike Hedges) for Mercury Records, Now (produced by Gil Dor & Yoad Nevo) and Genes & Jeans (produced by Gil Dor) for Universal Music. In addition, Noa recorded a live album with the Israel Philharmonic Orchestra, and a live CD and DVD with The Solis String Quartet.

Studio albums
Achinoam Nini and Gil Dor (September 1993)
Noa (March 1994)
Calling (May 1996)
Achinoam Nini (April 1997)
Blue Touches Blue (March 2000)
Now (September 2002)
Genes & Jeans (April 2008)
Noapolis – Noa Sings Napoli (February 2011)
The Israeli Songbook (March 2011)
Love Medicine (2015)
Letters to Bach (2019)
Afterallogy (2021)

Live albums
Achinoam Nini and Gil Dor Live (July 1991)
Achinoam Nini & the Israel Philharmonic Orchestra (April 1998)
Noa Live – DVD/Double CD with the Solis Quartet (October 2005)
Napoli-Tel Aviv (September 2006)

Compilations and other albums
First Collection (March 2001)
Noa Gold (October 2003)
There Must Be Another Way – with Mira Awad (2009)

Singles
Mishaela (Be'eineiha) (1992)
Uri (Akara) (1992)
He (Boi Kala) (1993)
Nocturno (Keren Or) (1993)
I Don't Know (1994)
Ave Maria (1994)
Wildflower (1995)
Child of Man (1995)
U.N.I (1996)
Too Proud (1996)
Lama (1996)
Mark of Cain (1996)
By the Light of the Moon (1996)
Vivre (1997)
Nanua (1997)
Mushrooms (Pitriot) (1997)
But Love (Aval Ahava) (1997)
Babel (1999)
One Becomes Two (1999)
Beautiful That Way (2000)
If I Give You Everything (2000)
The Beauty of That (2000)
Again and Again (Otra Vez) (2001)
Eye in the Sky (2002)
We (2002)
Now Forget (2003)
Shalom, Shalom (2003)
Dreamer (2008)
Genes & Jeans (2008)
There Must Be Another Way (2008)
Someone Out There (Yesh Ey Sham) (2011)
There Were Nights (Hayu Leilot) (2011)
Autumn Wind (Ruach Stav) (2011)
Lullabye (Shir Eres) (2011)
Nothing But a Song (2014)

FAO ambassador
In October 2003, Noa was named Goodwill Ambassador of the Food and Agriculture Organization of the United Nations.

Political views
Though Noa claimed "she has paid a price in Israel for 'being outspoken about peace and expressing left-wing political views'", she has performed at Israel's Independence Day celebrations in London and Vancouver. She is also an outspoken opponent of the BDS movement, noting that she herself has been "a victim of its hypocritical and harmful activity."

References

External links

Israeli Eurovision Official site
Israel Broadcast Authority Eurovision news
Video-Interview at Caprices Festival 
FAO Goodwill Ambassador website

1969 births
Living people
20th-century Israeli women singers
Israeli pop singers
21st-century Israeli women singers
Israeli people of Yemeni-Jewish descent
Geffen Records artists
Ramaz School alumni
English-language singers from Israel
Jewish peace activists
Musicians from Tel Aviv
Israeli soul singers
Eurovision Song Contest entrants for Israel
Eurovision Song Contest entrants of 2009
Folk-pop singers
Jewish Israeli musicians
Jewish women singers
Far-left politics in Israel